What Mattered Most is the debut studio album by American country music artist Ty Herndon, issued in 1995 on Epic Records. The album's title track, which was Herndon's debut single, reached No. 1 on the Billboard Hot Country Singles & Tracks (now Hot Country Songs) charts in mid-1995. Other singles from the album were, in order, "I Want My Goodbye Back," "Heart Half Empty" (a duet with Stephanie Bentley) and "In Your Face." Doug Johnson produced the entire album, with additional production from Ed Seay on "Heart Half Empty".

Content
What Mattered Most was released on April 18, 1995, via Epic Records Nashville. The album is led off by its title track, which is also the first single from it. Written by Gary Burr and Vince Melamed, this song became Herndon's first No. 1 country hit in May 1995, peaking on both the U.S. Billboard Country Singles charts and Canadian RPM Country Singles charts. Following it were "I Want My Goodbye Back," "Heart Half Empty" (another Gary Burr co-write), and "In Your Face." Respectively, these reached 7, 21, and 63 on the U.S. Country charts. "Heart Half Empty," a duet with Stephanie Bentley, was her first chart single. It was reprised on her 1996 debut album Hopechest, also on Epic Records.

"You Just Get One" was later released as a single by Jeff Wood from his 1997 debut album Between the Earth and the Stars. Additionally, "Summer Was a Bummer" was later recorded by Wade Hayes on his 1998 album When the Wrong One Loves You Right, and "You Don't Mess Around with Jim" is a cover of the Jim Croce song from 1972.

What Mattered Most debuted at number 15 on Top Country Albums and #1 on Top Heatseekers, the highest album debut for a country artist since Billy Ray Cyrus' Some Gave All in 1992. It peaked at number 9 on the former chart. In addition, the album had the highest first-day shipment in the history of Epic Records' Nashville division.

Critical reception
Giving it 3.5 stars out of 5, Michael McCall of New Country wrote that "For the most part, Herndon comes on like a confident newcomer worthy of attention." He praised the title track, "Pretty Good Thing", "Hat Full of Rain", and "I Want My Goodbye Back" for Herndon's vocal delivery, but criticized the same on the "You Don't Mess Around with Jim" cover. He also panned "Heart Half Empty", "You Just Get One", and "In Your Face" for their "unduly shallow" lyrics. An uncredited review in Billboard was favorable, saying that "With a rich, expressive voice that is equally suited to pensive ballads and rollicking, uptempo tunes, Herndon is one of country's most impressive newcomers."

Track listing

Personnel

Stephanie Bentley - duet vocals (track 5), background vocals (track 9)
Gary Burr - background vocals
John Catchings - strings (track 10)
Carol Chase - background vocals (track 4)
Joe Chemay - bass guitar
David Davidson - strings (track 10)
Joe Diffie - background vocals (tracks 3, 10)
Dan Dugmore - steel guitar
Connie Ellisor - strings (track 10)
Paul Franklin - Dobro (tracks 1, 9), steel guitar (track 2)
Vince Gill - background vocals (track 7)
Jim Grosjean - strings (track 10)
Rob Hajacos - fiddle
Connie Heard - strings (track 10)
Ty Herndon - lead vocals
Dann Huff - electric guitar (track 5)
Kraig Hutchens - electric guitar (tracks 1, 7)
Mike Jones - background vocals
Paul Leim - drums (tracks 1, 5, 6, 7, 9)
Patty Loveless - background vocals (track 10)
Terry McMillan - percussion
Steve Nathan - keyboards
Kathryn Plumber - strings (track 10)
Brent Rowan - electric guitar
Christian Teal - strings (track 10)
Ron Wallace - background vocals
Biff Watson - acoustic guitar
Kristin Wilkinson - strings (track 10)
Lonnie Wilson - drums (tracks 2, 3, 4, 8, 10)

Production

Jim Burnett - digital editing, assistant engineer
Don Cobb - editing
Paige Conners - production assistant
Emory Gordy, Jr. - string arrangement (track 10)
Bill Johnson - art direction
Doug Johnson - production (all tracks)
Anthony Martin - assistant engineer
Frank Ockenfels - photography
Denny Purcell - mastering
Ed Seay - production (track 5 only), engineering, mixing
Rollow Welch - art direction

Charts

Weekly charts

Year-end charts

References

[ What Mattered Most] at Allmusic

1995 debut albums
Ty Herndon albums
Epic Records albums
Albums produced by Doug Johnson (record producer)